Turkey Home is a country branding project of Turkey by courtesy of Turkish Ministry of Culture and Tourism. Launched in April 2014, the brand aims to build a strong, sustainable, sincere, convincing and comprehensive, ways of communication with all travel audience from all over the world in order to create awareness of Turkey's cultural and historical heritage, natural beauties, arts and sciences, touristic sites, values, traditions, facilities, social and daily life, etc. By promoting country's all attractions and emphasizing its geographic and cultural diversity, the brand is designed to associate Turkey with the concept of "HOME" as it has welcomed, hosted and fostered a myriad of identities, cultures and civilizations throughout history.

History
At the beginning of 2014 Irfan Önal, The Director General of Promotion for the Turkish Ministry of Culture and Tourism set forth a new promotional branding strategy with Turkey Home. Until then, the Ministry had various worldwide promotion campaigns in many offline and online platforms. With  the brand quickly gaining recognition and starting to become a phrase in Turkish Tourism, The Ministry revamped its out-dated reach to foreigners and started to innovate in the field of global tourism.

Just after 16 months, the brand grew to the 2nd among all other competitive tourism brands of cities and countries in terms of total number of fans and followers across all its social and digital media platforms. By August 2016, Turkey Home expanded its global audience to more than six and a half million individuals, still holding the 2nd rank globally.

The brand also helped Turkey to overcome the social and political stereotypes for foreign travellers by breaking down prejudices and reaching out to travellers through different platforms.

Awards
 Skift.com placed Turkey Home 3rd in terms of the most tourism-related searches among all international brands in 2015. 
 Skift awarded Turkey Home "The Best Branded Facebook Page" in September 2015 at the Skifties 2015 Social Media Awards for Travel Brands.

See also
 Tourism in Turkey
 Index of Turkey-related articles
 Outline of Turkey
 Provinces of Turkey

References

External links

 Skift.com article on Turkey Home  
 [Turkiye Portal|http://www.turkiyehome.net ] 

Tourism in Turkey